Who's Who In The Wrestling World – And Why? is a 1927 short Australian film. It was a 20-minute send up of wrestling. It was made by Al Daff who went on to become one of the most successful Australian-born film executives of all time.

The film was shot in Melbourne.

The wrestlers included Australian champions Weber and Meeske.

References

1927 films
Australian silent short films
Australian black-and-white films